Yaroslav Mykhaylovych Dobrokhotov (born 1 November 2000) is a Ukrainian professional footballer who plays as a central midfielder for Mariupol in the Ukrainian First League.

Career
Dobrokhotov is a product mainly of Shakhtar Donetsk youth sportive school system.

He made his début for FC Mariupol in the Ukrainian Premier League as a substituted player in a drawing away match against FC Rukh Lviv on 20 November 2020.

References

External links
 
 

2000 births
Living people
People from Stakhanov, Ukraine
Ukrainian footballers
Association football midfielders
FC Krystal Kherson players
FC Mariupol players
FC Yarud Mariupol players
Ukrainian Premier League players
Ukrainian First League players
Ukrainian Second League players
Ukrainian Amateur Football Championship players
Sportspeople from Luhansk Oblast